Zena El Khalil (born 1976) is a Lebanese artist, writer, and activist.

Biography
El Khalil attained her undergraduate degree from the American University in Beirut. In 2002 El Khalil received her Masters of Fine Arts from the School of Visual Arts in New York.

El Khalil works in a variety of formats ranging from painting, installation, performance, mixed media, writing, video, and collage. Themes that are central to her work include issues of violence as well as gender using materials found throughout Beirut. Photocopied images of militiamen and women, civilians and family members are embellished with plastic flowers, glitter, strings of lights, keffiyehs, plastic toy soldiers, toy AK-47s, arabesques, beads, fabrics, and other objects. She has had solo exhibitions in London, Munich, and Beirut. El Khalil currently lives and works in Beirut.

During the July War in Lebanon, El Khalil immediately began maintaining beirutupdate from her apartment in Beirut. Her blog was a personal account of the siege on Beirut that lasted for 33 days and its impact on her and the people around her. It quickly received international attention and was highly publicized on news portals such as CNN and the BBC. Excerpts were published in daily papers, including The Guardian and Der Spiegel Online. Her writing was also included in the anthology Lebanon, Lebanon published by Saqi Books. In the aftermath of that war, Zena El Khalil curated with Sandra Dagher Nafas Beirut, a multimedia exhibition including 40 artists testimonies of the war.

In 2008 El Khalil also completed her first novel, Beirut, I Love You. The book is a memoir about El Khalil's life from 1994 to the present and specifically focuses on growing up in Beirut during a period of immense turmoil. There are also rumors that the book is going to be made into a film.

Work

Solo exhibitions
 2017 "Sacred Catastrophe: Healing Lebanon" - Beit Beirut, Beirut, Lebanon
 2008  "Maybe One Day Beirut Will Love Me Back." – The Flawless Gallery, Berardi-Sagharchi Projects London, UK
 2006  "I Love You." – Espace SD, Beirut, Lebanon
 2004  "Wahad Areese, Please!" ("A Husband, Please!") - Le Laboratoire, Espace SD, Beirut, Lebanon
 2003  "of love and war..." – Signature Art Gallery, Lagos, Nigeria

Selected group exhibitions
 2013 "Arab Express: The Latest Art from the Arab World" Mori Art Museum, Tokyo, Japan
 2013 "Art13 London" - Olympia Grand Hall, London, UK
 2012 "Art is the Answer!" Villa Empain, Brussels, Belgium
 2008  "But, I Can't Let Go" Galerie Tanit, Munich, Germany
 2007  "The Resilient Landscape" – Ivan Dougherty Gallery, Sydney Australia
 "More Than Light Could Bear" – Art Lounge, Beirut, Lebanon
 "Ana "Njassa Al Fan" ("I Pear Art") – Dialogpunkt Deutsch, Tripoli, Lebanon
 2006 "Pure Pop" – Art Lounge, Beirut, Lebanon
 "Nafas Beirut" – Espace SD Beirut, Lebanon
 "Imagining Ourselves" – International Museum of Women, San Francisco, USA

References

External links

 Official Website of Zena El Khalil

 Official Instagram page of Zena El Khalil

xanadu*
beirut update

1976 births
Living people
Installation artists
Performance artists
Lebanese writers
Pop artists
Lebanese activists
Lebanese painters
Date of birth missing (living people)
Lebanese women artists
Women performance artists
Women installation artists
Lebanese women painters
21st-century women artists